This article displays the rosters for the teams competing at the 2013 Women's EuroHockey Nations Championship. Each team had to submit 18 players.

Pool A

Belarus
Head Coach: Aliaksandr Kisel

Belgium
Head Coach: Pascal Kina

Ireland
Head Coach: Darren Smith

Netherlands
Head Coach: Maximiliano Caldas

Pool B

England
Head Coach: Jason Lee

Germany
Head Coach: Jamilon Mülders

Scotland
Head Coach: Gordon Shepherd

Spain
Head Coach: Adrian Lock

References

Women's EuroHockey Nations Championship squads
squads